Saeed Ibn Qais Hamdani  One of the leaders and Tabi‘un Hermit  including close friends Ali and Hasan ibn Ali, head of the Yemeni tribe of Hamdan in Iraq. In the year 33 AH by Saeed bin Aas, who was then governor Osman was in Kufa, responsible government was Rey, Iran.

Characteristics 
He was faithful helpers Ali. Ali ibn Abi Talib in several battles, including the Battle of the Camel, Battle of Siffin the head of the army. After the death of Ali, Saeed ibn Qays al-Hamadani had joined Hasan ibn Ali and  companions.

Death 
Date of his death is not known but some date in the year 50 AH he noted.

References 

Tabi‘un
Iraqi Shia Muslims
7th-century Arabs